The Baseball Project is a supergroup composed of Peter Buck, Mike Mills, Scott McCaughey, Steve Wynn and Linda Pitmon formed in 2007. The performers came together from discussions between McCaughey and Wynn at R.E.M.'s March 21, 2007 induction into the Rock and Roll Hall of Fame at the Waldorf-Astoria Hotel in New York City. They invited Buck to play bass guitar and Pitmon on drums and recorded their first album, Volume 1: Frozen Ropes and Dying Quails later that year. Buck and McCaughey have previously played together in Robyn Hitchcock and The Venus 3, The Minus 5, R.E.M., and Tuatara. Wynn is the former leader of The Dream Syndicate as well as Gutterball and currently plays with Pitmon in Steve Wynn & the Miracle 3.

The second album from The Baseball Project, Volume 2: High and Inside, was released on March 1, 2011 on Yep Roc Records. The band followed the record's release with a tour covering the U.S. and appearances at Spring Training games in Arizona's Cactus League.

The band also recorded a 'real time' commentary on the 2010 baseball season for ESPN.com: one song every month made available as a free download. The collection was released in 2011 (along with unreleased extra tracks from Volume 1: Frozen Ropes and Dying Quails and Volume 2: High and Inside,) as The Broadside Ballads.

Their third album, 3rd, was released in 2014.

Discography

Studio albums
Volume 1: Frozen Ropes and Dying Quails (Yep Roc, 2008)
Volume 2: High and Inside (Yep Roc, 2011)
3rd (Yep Roc, 2014)

EPs and singles
The Homerun EP (Yep Roc, 2009)
El Hombre (Euclid Records single, 2012)

References

External links

Official website: thebaseballproject.net
Broadside Ballads on The Baseball Project's Bandcamp page
Interview on MLB.com
Wall Street Journal story (must be subscribed to WSJ)
"Batter Up--To the Mic: The Baseball Project" from WBUR, Boston

American rock music groups
Baseball music
Musical groups established in 2007
R.E.M.
Rock music supergroups
2007 establishments in Oregon
Musical quintets